Stergios Roumeliotis is an engineer and adjunct professor at the Department of Computer Science and Engineering at the University of Minnesota, Minneapolis. He was named a Fellow of the Institute of Electrical and Electronics Engineers (IEEE) in 2016 for his contributions to visual-inertial navigation and cooperative localization.

References 

Fellow Members of the IEEE
Living people
Year of birth missing (living people)
University of Minnesota faculty
Place of birth missing (living people)
American electrical engineers